Na-Ga is a male Japanese artist who is employed as a graphic designer and illustrator for the company Key known for such famous visual novels as Kanon, Air, and Clannad among others. Na-Ga has been working for Key since the production of Air as one of the computer graphic artists, but was able to majorly contribute to character design in Key's sixth visual novel Little Busters! with Itaru Hinoue, along with the later released Little Busters! Ecstasy and Kud Wafter. For Key's ninth title Rewrite, Na-Ga contributed to the game's computer graphics. Na-Ga worked in collaboration with Jun Maeda and ASCII Media Works' Dengeki G's Magazine to produce the mixed media projects Angel Beats! and Charlotte as the original character designer. Na-Ga once worked for the company Pearlsoft R between 1997 and 1999 where he contributed to the visual novels Sweet Days, and Hakanai Omoi: Anemone as the main artist, and on Watashi where he was credited as a graphic designer. He also participates in a dōjinshi circle named "from-D".

Reception
An autographed T-shirt featuring an illustration by Na-Ga of Riki Naoe from Little Busters! was put onto the Japanese Yahoo! Auction website in March 2009; bidding for the shirt started at 500 yen. The shirt was bid on by 71 people and sold for just over 2 million yen. The shirt was originally released at Key 10th Memorial Fes, an event held in commemoration of Key's ten-year anniversary between February 28 and March 1, 2009.

References

External links
Na-Ga's personal website 
Key's official website 

Japanese illustrators
Japanese video game designers
Key (company)
Living people
Video game artists
Year of birth missing (living people)